The Fletcher BG-2 was a proposed American bomb glider designed by Fletcher Aviation in World War II.

Design
The XBG-2 (Model 16) was conceived by the Fletcher company as a wooden bomb-carrying glider as a derivative of its earlier BG-1, in turn based on the company's YCQ-1 drone control plane (a conversion of its unsuccessful FBT-2 trainer). It was to use two fuselages and outer wing panels of the BG-1 joined by a new wing center section and a horizontal tailplane connecting the two vertical fins, as well as a TV fairing under the inboard wing on the centerline or in the starboard fuselage nose. The main landing gear was supported by four main gear struts, and each fuselage would have housed a 2,000-pound bomb.

Three XBG-2s (serials 42-46902/4) were ordered by the USAAF in April 1942. However, when flight characteristics of the BG-1 turned out to be unsatisfactory, on September 8, 1942, the BG-2 contract was cancelled without any completed.

Specifications

References

Notes

Fletcher aircraft
Glider aircraft